"Beercan" is a single by Beck, taken from his first major record label release, Mellow Gold.  It peaked at number 27 on the U.S. Modern Rock Tracks charts.

Conception and recording
"Beercan" was produced by Carl Stephenson and featured his characteristic layers of sound and bizarre samples: this song in particular prominently features samples from a Care Bears album. The song also samples a small part of the Melvins song "Hog Leg" 

As mentioned in the song, Beck once had a job blowing leaves. Beck once reminisced, "There's a leaf-blower contingent. There's no union that I know of so far, but there's certainly a spiritual brotherhood. They are the originators of noise music. It's like a cross between a Kramer guitar and a jet pack."

Music video
Like Beck's earlier single "Loser", the experimental video for "Beercan" was directed by friend and director Steve Hanft. The video features a group of homeless people destroying a house. A recurring theme throughout the video is the presence of a rainbow, possibly a reference to the Care Bears album sampled in the song. Melvins frontman Buzz Osborne also makes an appearance.

Track listing
 "Beercan" - 4:01
 "Got No Mind" - 4:22
 "Asskiss Powergrudge (Payback! '94)" - 3:06
 "Totally Confused" - 3:28
 "Spanking Room" - 9:07  
 Contains "Loser" (Pseudo-Muzak Version) as a hidden track at 5:41.

Chart positions

References

External links

Beck songs
1994 singles
Songs written by Beck
1994 songs
DGC Records singles